Złota Kaczka (translation: Golden Duck) is a Polish award presented by the monthly Film since 1956.

Złota Kaczka for best movie 

 1956: Sprawa pilota Maresza
 1957: Kanał
 1958: Popiół i diament
 1959: Pociąg
 1960: Krzyżacy
 1961: Matka Joanna od Aniołów
 1962: Nóż w wodzie
 1963: Jak być kochaną
 1964: Pierwszy dzień wolności
 1965: Popioły
 1966: Faraon
 1967: Westerplatte
 1968: Żywot Mateusza
 1969: Pan Wołodyjowski
 1970: Krajobraz po bitwie
 1971: Życie rodzinne
 1972: not admitted
 1973: not admitted
 1974: Potop
 1975: Bilans kwartalny
 1976: Przepraszam, czy tu biją?
 1977: Kochaj albo rzuć
 1978: Spirala
 1979: Klincz
 1980: Kung-fu
 1981: not admitted
 1982: not admitted
 1983: Wielki Szu
 1984: Seksmisja
 1985: Yesterday
 1986: C.K. Dezerterzy
 1987: Matka Królów
 1988: Krótki film o zabijaniu
 1989: Przesłuchanie
 1990: Ucieczka z kina "Wolność"
 1991: Podwójne życie Weroniki
 1992: Psy
 1993: Kolejność uczuć
 1994: Trzy kolory: Biały
 1995: Tato
 1996: Pułkownik Kwiatkowski
 1997: Kiler
 1998: Historia kina w Popielawach
 1999: Ogniem i mieczem
 2000: Life as a Fatal Sexually Transmitted Disease
 2001: Cześć Tereska
 2002: Edi
 2003: Ciało
 2004: Pręgi
 2005: Komornik
 2006: Plac Zbawiciela
 2007: Ziemia obiecana (the best movie of 50th anniversary of Złote Kaczki)
 2008: Lejdis
 2009: 33 sceny z życia
 2010: Dom zły
 2011: Sala samobójców
 2012: Jesteś Bogiem

External links 
  

Polish film awards
Awards established in 1956
1956 establishments in Poland